Ruskin Company is a manufacturer of air control solutions. It was founded in the Ruskin Heights area of Kansas City in 1958. Ruskin products include fire dampers, smoke dampers, fire/smoke dampers, air control dampers, louvers, aluminum sunshades, air monitoring stations, economizers, energy recovery ventilators, high efficiency OEM fans, duct silencers, sound panels for equipment enclosures, industrial and tunnel ventilation dampers, and air curtains.  The Ruskin Company brands include Ruskin, Reliable, Lau, Eastern Sheet Metal, Actionair,  Air Diffusion, Naco, Ruskin Sound Control, and Ruskin Rooftop Systems.  In 2014, Ruskin was acquired by Johnson Controls, INC.

References 

Manufacturing companies established in 1958
Manufacturing companies based in Kansas City, Missouri
1958 establishments in Missouri